Haynesville (also known as Punkin Center) is an unincorporated community in Wichita County, Texas, United States. It has an estimated population of 60.

Haynesville is part of the Wichita Falls metropolitan area.

History
The community was established in 1890 and originally named Punkin Center, but later renamed after Henry Haynes, a county commissioner and local farmer. During most of the 20th century, Haynesville's population ranged between roughly 60 and 100 residents.

Geography
Haynesville is located at the intersection of State Highways 25 and 240, 5 miles north of Electra in northwestern Wichita County. The community's elevation is 1,132 ft above sea level.

Education
The Electra Independent School District serves the community of Haynesville.

External links

Unincorporated communities in Texas
Unincorporated communities in Wichita County, Texas
Wichita Falls metropolitan area